is a Japanese professional sumo wrestler from Anamizu, Ishikawa. After a successful amateur career, he turned professional in March 2013, making the top makuuchi division that September. His highest rank has been komusubi. He has been awarded one special prize for Fighting Spirit, one for Outstanding Performance and three for Technique, as well as seven gold stars for defeating yokozuna. He was runner-up in the September 2016 and September 2021 tournaments. He wrestles for Oitekaze stable. He is extremely popular with sumo fans and has been regarded as one of the most promising home-grown wrestlers in sumo.

Early life and sumo background
Endō first began trying out sumo in his primary school years largely to please his father. He did not like sumo at first, but as time went on he became inspired by the spirit and technique of then yokozuna Asashōryū. He began trying out more techniques and came to love sumo. In his second year of junior high school, he participated in a Kanazawa area sumo competition, where he won the team championship as well as beating the future Tochinosato in a playoff to take the individual championship. In high school, he participated in several team and individual competitions, taking two separate championships. Upon graduation he entered Nihon University as an economics major. From his fourth year, he was captain of the sumo team. That year he also took two major national championship titles becoming both the amateur sumo yokozuna as well as the National Athletic Championship yokozuna. 
Despite his great success at sumo thus far, it was a difficult decision for Endō whether or not to go professional, because he had a dream of becoming a teacher.

Career 

After taking some time to reflect he decided to join professional sumo as a wrestler for Oitekaze stable, the stable where Daishōyama, who was from the same hometown as him, was the founder and head coach. Upon entering professional sumo, he was allowed to debut as a makushita tsukedashi instead of starting at the bottom of the ranks, to reflect his amateur success. Moreover, because of his two national championships he was allowed to debut at an even higher rank than other amateur champions. This debut at makushita 10, was only the second time this has had been allowed, following his Nihon University predecessor Ichihara. He entered the professional ring in the March 2013 tournament, choosing to keep his surname of Endō as his shikona. He was not quite as successful as was expected, managing two consecutive tournaments with strong, but less than ideal, 5–2 records.  They were enough, however, to allow him to join the salaried ranks of jūryō for the July 2013 tournament. He did so without a top-knot as his hair was still not long enough for one. Debuting at the rank of jūryō 13, he came into his own, finally giving the kind of performance that had been expected of him. He beat several wrestlers with top makuuchi division experience as well as other up and comers, including the closely watched Egyptian wrestler Ōsunaarashi.  His only loss was to jūryō regular Tokushinhō. His 14–1 record was at least a four win berth over any other wrestler in the division and his championship was already decided by the 13th day of the tournament. His previous amateur success, his technique and his seemingly effortless championship fueled speculation that Endō could be the next big Japanese hope in professional sumo in a sport largely dominated by foreigners in the higher ranks.

His success continued into his makuuchi debut in September 2013, where he scored a majority of wins, although he damaged his left ankle and dropped out of the tournament on Day 14. After making a respectable comeback in November with a score of 6–9 from the rank of maegashira 7, he had his best result in the top division to date in January 2014, winning eleven bouts and the Fighting Spirit Prize. He was even matched with an ōzeki, Kotoshōgiku, on Day 12, although he lost this bout. Promoted to the top of the maegashira ranks for the March 2014 tournament, he faced three ōzeki and two yokozuna in his first five matches. He lost the first four but defeated Kisenosato on Day 5, his first win over an ōzeki, and the fact that he was still without a top-knot was also noted. He finished the tournament with a 6–9. The following May 2014 tournament, while only managing a 7–8, he got his first kinboshi or gold star win against yokozuna Kakuryū.

Endō suffered a serious injury to his left knee after a bout against Shohozan on the fifth day of the March 2015 tournament, rupturing anterior cruciate ligaments and damaging the lateral meniscus. He opted not to have surgery and competed in the following tournament in May, knowing he would be demoted to jūryō if he failed to take part. Although he only scored six wins against nine losses, it was enough to keep him in the top division. In the Nagoya tournament in July, he came through with a solid 10–5 record and recorded 8 wins in September. A disappointing 4–11 in November however, was followed by a sprain to his right ankle in the January 2016 tournament (attributed to over-compensating for his previous left knee injury) and Endō was demoted to the second division (jūryō) for March. He returned to the top division in May 2016 and scored 11–4, although a defeat on the final day meant he missed out on a share of the Fighting Spirit prize. In September 2016, fighting from the low rank of maegashira 14, he finished runner-up to Goeido on 13–2 and won his first Technique Prize. In November he defeated three ozeki and yokozuna Hakuho but lost four of his last five matches to finish with a make-koshi 7–8 record, which cost him the Outstanding Performance Award. Fighting at the rank of maegashira 1 in May 2017 (his highest rank since September 2014), on Day 4 he was the first to earn a kinboshi against new yokozuna Kisenosato, giving Endo the third of his career. He withdrew from the July tournament on the fifth day due to an injury to his left ankle. He underwent surgery on the ankle in late July.

He picked up his fourth kinboshi in the January 2018 tournament with a defeat of Kakuryū, and won his second Technique Prize in March. His consecutive kachi-koshi performances in the tournaments following his injury earned him a sanyaku rank for the first time for the May 2018 tournament, at komusubi. In his sanyaku debut he injured his right arm in his Day 6 match against fellow komusubi Mitakeumi and had to withdraw from the tournament. Although he returned on Day 10 he was unable to win any of his remaining matches and finished with a 3–10–2 record.

He earned his fifth and sixth kinboshi with back-to-back victories over Kakuryū and Hakuho on Day 1 and Day 2 of the January 2020 Hatsu basho. He came the third wrestler post WWII to win back-to-back kinboshi on the opening two days of a tournament, and the first since Tochiazuma in September 1999. He returned to komusubi in March, but after a 7–8 record was demoted to maegashira 1. In July he earned another kinboshi, defeating Kakuryū on opening day. Back at komusubi in September 2020, he withdrew on Day 11 with only three wins, after a build-up of fluid in his right knee related to his previous injury. He withdrew from the March 2021 tournament on Day 10, due to a calf injury that he suffered in training before the tournament and aggravated on Day 9. Ranked at maegashira 8 in May 2021, He stood at 9–3 after twelve days, and was then matched against two ōzeki, defeating Takakeishō on Day 13, and then tournament leader Terunofuji on Day 14, a close bout that went to a judges' conference after the gyōji  had originally called Terunofuji the winner. This put him just one win off the lead going into the final day, and had he won his final bout he could have been involved in a three-way playoff for the yūshō with Takakeishō and Terunofuji. However, he lost to Shōdai in his last match, finishing on 11–4 and missing out on the Outstanding Performance Prize. He did receive his fourth career Technique Prize. He was forced to withdraw from the July 2021 basho after reinjuring his left leg, which required about three weeks of recovery. Fighting from the rank of  11 in September, he produced an 11–4 record and shared runner-up honours with Myōgiryū. 

Endo has been extremely popular among fans, some of whom praise his face and deep voice and tie his success to the overall popularity of sumo. The Japan Sumo Association has capitalized on this popularity by marketing a pillow depicting Endo readying for a charge.

He is the owner of the Kitajin toshiyori kabu or elder stock, purchased from the former Kirinji in May 2018, indicating he intends to stay in sumo as a coach upon his retirement.

Personal life
In October 2019, Endo announced that he had been married since May and was no longer living at his stable. He declined to answer any questions about his bride saying "She's an ordinary member of the public, so I think it's not necessary to answer to that".

Fighting style 
Endō is a yotsu-sumo wrestler, preferring grappling techniques to pushing and thrusting. His most common winning kimarite is a straightforward yori kiri, or force out, and he uses a hidari yotsu grip on the mawashi or belt, with his right hand outside and left hand inside his opponent's arms. He has a flexible offense and is good at catching his opponents off-guard.

Career record

See also
List of sumo tournament top division runners-up
List of sumo tournament second division champions
List of active gold star earners
Glossary of sumo terms
List of active sumo wrestlers
List of komusubi
Active special prize winners

References

External links 

Sumo people from Ishikawa Prefecture
1990 births
Living people
Nihon University alumni
Japanese sumo wrestlers
Sumo wrestlers who use their birth name
Komusubi